KYIS (98.9 FM, "98.9 KISS FM") is a hot adult contemporary radio station serving the Oklahoma City area and is owned by Cumulus Media.  KYIS-FM's studios are located in Northwest Oklahoma City and a transmitter site is in the Northside of the city.

History
The earliest known format of the station is urban contemporary when it went by the call letters KFJL in the 1970s. Another early callsign of the station was KYFM with its transmitter located on the Lakeshore tower near the Northwest Expressway and May Avenue. At one point, the transmitter location was co-located on the 890 AM tower at Britton and Eastern. The calls were then changed to KTLS (The LifeStyle), and flipped to a Christian format.

It changed calls in September 1980 to KLNK, and ran an adult contemporary format known as "The Link."  Bill Lacey of Zuma Broadcasting changed calls again in 1983 to KZBS, and the station was known as "Z99" and "99FM" for a time.  KZBS was known for many extravagant promotions including a home giveaway that was surrounded by a great deal of controversy. KZBS switched between Top 40, Rhythmic Top 40 and hot adult contemporary, and switched full-time to Hot AC, becoming KYIS (KISS-FM), on August 28, 1991. The station became successful in 1993 with new Program Director Jon Zellner, who hosted afternoons. Zellner hired the Jack and Ron morning show and Kathi Yeager for middays. KYIS started making serious inroads against competitor KJYO with Zellner and later with another program director, Ray Kalusa. Jack and Ron stayed on until 2016, when they were moved to sister station KQOB.

Dial/Greyhound repossessed KZBS from Zuma in 1990, and then the station was debt-combined with KATT in August 1994.

As of 2016, KYIS' morning show is hosted by Joey Combs and Heather Emery, with Nugget as producer and Abe Froman as his assistant. They’ve won the “Best Morning Show” award of the Oklahoma Gazette every year they have been at KYIS. Martha Steele handles afternoons & The Adam Bomb Show is on at Night.

External links
KYIS official website

 KZBS Repossession Court Document

YIS
Hot adult contemporary radio stations in the United States
Cumulus Media radio stations